Svetlana Pankratova (born April 29, 1971) is a Russian woman formerly recognized, according to Guinness World Records, as having the longest legs of any woman in the world.

While she is not the world's tallest woman, her legs are 132 centimeters
long. She has also very large feet, size 13 (US) / 46 (EU).

Pankratova was born in Volgograd, Russian SFSR, USSR. She played women's basketball at Virginia Commonwealth University in Richmond, Virginia, USA, from 1992 to 1995. She was an impact player, setting two school records which are still unbroken:

No. 1 ⁃ Career Blocked Shots, 1992–95 (176)
No. 1 ⁃ Single Season Total Blocked Shots, 1994–95 (75)
No. 8 ⁃ Single Season Field Goals, 1994–95 (178)

Pankratova appeared in Trafalgar Square in London on September 16, 2008 with He Pingping, then the smallest man in the world (before his death in March, 2010), to promote the 2009 edition of the Guinness World Records. Along with her native Russian, Pankratova speaks English and some Spanish. She lived in Torremolinos, Spain.

On March 11, 2013 it was reported that Pankratova returned to Virginia after marrying local resident Jack Gosnell. She accepted a position as an assistant coach for the Meridian High School girls’ basketball team.

In 2017, Pankratova was surpassed by Yekaterina Lisina (also Russian) for the record of  the woman with the longest legs.

References

External links
 

1971 births
Living people
Russian expatriate basketball people in the United States
Sportspeople from Volgograd
Russian women's basketball players
VCU Rams women's basketball players
Soviet women's basketball players
World record holders